Yana Molodezki (Hebrew: יאנה מולודצקי; born 1 January 1996) is an Israeli badminton player.

Achievements

BWF International Challenge/Series 
Women's doubles

  BWF International Challenge tournament
  BWF International Series tournament
  BWF Future Series tournament

References

External links 
 

1996 births
Living people
Israeli female badminton players
Competitors at the 2017 Maccabiah Games
Maccabiah Games bronze medalists for Israel
Maccabiah Games medalists in badminton
21st-century Israeli women